Dick Powell's Zane Grey Theatre is an American Western anthology television series that was broadcast on CBS from October 5, 1956, until May 18, 1961.

Format 
Many episodes were based on novels by Zane Grey, to all of which Four Star Films held exclusive rights. Dick Powell was the host and the star of some episodes. Many of the guest stars made their TV debuts on the program.

Powell said that working with Grey's stories proved to be both a benefit and a challenge. While he spoke of "the vast output of wonderful action stories from Zane Grey's pen", he acknowledged the challenge of "trying to compress a novel into half an hour of storytelling on television." Some stories could be adapted relatively easily, while others had to be skipped or only parts of them could be used for scripts. Over time, script writers used up the supply of adaptable material from Grey and began to adapt other authors' stories.

Preview and reception

A preview of the show in the trade publication Billboard indicated that it would appeal to women viewers as well as to men. It noted that among the stories adapted from Grey's work "There will usually be strong love interests." In early February 1957, Billboard evaluated Zane Grey Theatre as  "one of the strong contenders for the title of most important new show, according to many of its ratings."

Broadcast History

Note:All times Eastern

Zane Grey Theatre first aired on Fridays when it replaced Our Miss Brooks in the fall of 1956, then it moved to Thursdays during its third season.

In the summer of 1959, episodes of the program were repeated on a "rerun subsidiary" titled Frontier Justice, with Melvyn Douglas as host, on Mondays from 9 to 9:30 P.M. ET.

In August 1961, Zane Grey Theatre was one of four programs whose episodes were sold to Procter & Gamble to be broadcast in Canada.

Zane Grey Theatre ended when Powell moved to NBC's, The Dick Powell Show, CBS replaced it with The New Bob Cummings Show that fall.

They reran the show again in the summer of 1962.

Production 
Four Star Films was the producing company, with Powell as executive producer. Producers included Helen Ainsworth, Hal Hudson, and Aaron Spelling. Directors included Felix Feist, William D. Faralla, James Sheldon, and Budd Boetticher. Writers included Marion Hargrove.

Sponsors included Johnson Wax.

Episodes

Series Overview

Season 1 (1956–1957)

Season 2 (1957–1958)

Season 3 (1958–1959)

Season 4 (1959–1960)

Season 5 (1960–1961)

Home media

References 

1956 American television series debuts
1962 American television series endings
1950s American anthology television series
1960s American anthology television series
1950s Western (genre) television series
1960s Western (genre) television series
CBS original programming
English-language television shows
Television series based on American novels